Louis Le Laboureur (1615–1679) was a French poet.

Early life
Louis Le Laboureur was born in 1615 in Montmorency, Val-d'Oise, France. His paternal uncle, Claude Le Laboureur, was the provost of the Abbey of Île Barbe on the Île Barbe in Lyon and a book collector. His brother, Jean Le Laboureur, was a historian.

Career
Le Laboureur was a poet. His best-known poems are Charlemagne, La Promenade de Saint-Germain, and Les victoires du Duc d'Anguien. He was also the author of a treatise on the superiority of the French language over Latin.

Death
Le Laboureur died in 1679 in Montmorency, France.

References

1615 births
1679 deaths
People from Val-d'Oise
17th-century French poets
17th-century French male writers
French male poets